Joseph Clemence Rwegasira (March 21, 1935 – March 4, 2016) was a Tanzanian politician and diplomat. Rwegasira, a former member of the National Assembly for Nkenge Constituency, served as Minister of Foreign Affairs from 1993 to 1995. He also held the government portfolios of Minister for Trade and Industry and Minister for Labour and Youth Development at various times during his political career. He had also served as a Regional Commissioner for Dar es Salaam at one time.

Rwegasira had served as Tanzania's Ambassador to neighboring Zambia.

Rwegasira died at Muhimbili National Hospital (MNH) in Dar es Salaam, Tanzania, on March 4, 2016, at the age of 80. He was buried in his home village of Bugombe-Kanyigo, Misenyi District, Kagera Region, on March 8, 2016.

References

1935 births
2016 deaths
Foreign ministers of Tanzania
Government ministers of Tanzania
Ambassadors of Tanzania to Zambia
Members of the National Assembly (Tanzania)
People from Missenyi District